Hugo Gyldmark (28 June 1899 - 7 September 1971) was a Danish composer and conductor.

Gyldmark played cello from a young age and his first engagement as an orchestral musician was at 15 years of age  Back in Copenhagen he formed with his brothers Leonard and Sven Gyldmark and formed the Gyldmark trio, which played for the silent film projections. He also acted under the name of Sid Merriman.

See also
List of Danish composers

References
This article was initially translated from the Danish Wikipedia.

Male composers
1899 births
1971 deaths
20th-century Danish composers
20th-century Danish male musicians